Alfred William Wilcock (1887–1953) was a cathedral organist, who served in Derby Cathedral and Exeter Cathedral.

Background
Alfred Wilcock was born on 21 October 1887 in Colne Lancashire.

He studied organ under James Kendrick Pyne at Manchester Cathedral.

Career
Organist of:
Derby Cathedral (1930–1933)
Exeter Cathedral (1933–1952)

References

1887 births
1953 deaths
English classical organists
British male organists
Cathedral organists
People from Colne
20th-century organists
20th-century British male musicians
20th-century classical musicians
Male classical organists